Juan C. Zaragoza Gómez is a certified public accountant and the former Secretary of Treasury of Puerto Rico. Juan Zaragoza Gomez has a B.B.A. in accounting from the University of Puerto Rico and a master's in Management from Indiana University.

References

1959 births
21st-century American politicians
Indiana University alumni
Living people
Members of the Senate of Puerto Rico
Members of the 16th Cabinet of Puerto Rico
People from Bayamón, Puerto Rico
Secretaries of Treasury of Puerto Rico
University of Puerto Rico alumni